Shiona Baird (born 14 September 1946) is a Scottish Green politician who was a Member of the Scottish Parliament (MSP) for the North East Scotland region from 2003 to 2007, and co-convener of the Scottish Greens from 2004 to 2007.

She is currently the chairperson of Auchterhouse Community Council.

Early life
Baird was born on 14 September 1946, in Hereford, England. She is a graduate of the University of Edinburgh. She worked on her family farm near Dundee before standing for election.

Scottish Parliament
In 2003 she was elected as an MSP for the North East Scotland region. She was a member of the Scottish Parliament Enterprise Committee and the Scottish Greens' Spokeswoman on enterprise, waste and energy issues. In November 2005 she criticised Scottish Labour and Scottish Liberal Democrats for "not taking seriously the crucial issues of energy and climate change."

Baird stood again in the 2007 election but was not elected. Alison Johnstone later took over as co-convener.

In the 2010 UK general election, Baird stood for Dundee East but was unsuccessful.

References

External links
 
Shiona Baird MSP Profile on the Scottish Green Party website

1946 births
Living people
People from Hereford
Leaders of the Scottish Green Party
Scottish Green Party MSPs
Alumni of the University of Edinburgh
Female members of the Scottish Parliament
Scottish pacifists
Members of the Scottish Parliament 2003–2007